The CAF Second Round was the second stage of qualification for the 1990 FIFA World Cup in the Confederation of African Football (CAF) zone.

The eight teams advancing from the first round were joined by the eight highest ranked African nations: Algeria, Cameroon, Ivory Coast, Egypt, Kenya, Morocco,  Nigeria and Zaire.

Format
The sixteen teams were drawn into four groups of four. Each group contained two of the seeded teams, and two teams that had advanced from the first round. The teams would play against each other on a home-and-away basis. The four group winners advanced to the Final Round.

Group A

Libya withdrew after playing their first group match; their second game was originally awarded to opponents Algeria by walkover, but all Libyan results were later annulled by FIFA.

Group B

Group C

 

 

 

 

 

 

 

 
Nigerian player Samuel Okwaraji died during this match.

Group D

External links
 Africa Zone at FIFA.com

2
Qual
Egypt at the 1990 FIFA World Cup